Gareth Davies may refer to:

Musicians
Gareth Glynne Davies, Welsh composer
Gareth Davies, bassist in Funeral for a Friend

Politicians
Gareth Davies (English politician) (born 1984), British Conservative MP for Grantham and Stamford
Gareth Davies (Welsh politician) (born 1988), Welsh Conservative MS for Vale of Clwyd

Sportspeople
Gareth Davies (cricketer) (born 1975), Welsh cricketer
Gareth Davies (footballer, born 1949), Welsh football central defender
Gareth Davies (footballer, born 1959), Welsh football midfielder
Gareth Davies (footballer, born 1973), Welsh football central defender
Gareth Davies (footballer, born 1983), English footballer
Gareth Davies (rugby union, born 1955), Welsh rugby union fly-half
Gareth Davies (rugby union, born 1984), Welsh rugby union fly-half
Gareth Davies (rugby union, born 1990), Welsh rugby union scrum-half
Gareth Davies (rugby league) (born 1973), Welsh professional rugby league footballer

Others
Gareth Davies (director), British television director and actor
Gareth Davies (television producer), television producer
Gareth Davies (doctor) (born 1965), British doctor
Gareth Alban Davies (1926–2009), Welsh writer and academic